Atiq Ullah is a Bangladesh Nationalist Party politician and a Member of Parliament from Habiganj-3.

Career
Ullah was elected to parliament from Habiganj-3 as an Bangladesh Nationalist Party candidate in 15 February 1996.

References

Bangladesh Nationalist Party politicians
Date of birth missing (living people)
6th Jatiya Sangsad members